Ivan Milosavljević (born 19 March 2000) is a Serbian football central midfielder who plays for TSC.

References

External links
 
 
 

2000 births
Living people
Association football midfielders
Serbian footballers
FK Voždovac players
FK Teleoptik players
FK TSC Bačka Topola players
Serbian First League players
Serbian SuperLiga players
Sportspeople from Kragujevac
Serbia under-21 international footballers